Gantiadi or Tsandryphsh, is an urban-type settlement on the Black Sea coast in Georgia, in the Gagra District of Abkhazia, 5 km from the Russian border.

Name 

Gantiadi in historical times, was known as Sauchi. Then, until 1944 as Yermolov, after the Russian general Aleksey Petrovich Yermolov. From 1944 until 1991, the settlement was known as Gantiadi, from the Georgian word for Dawn. After the 1992-93 war in Abkhazia, Gantiadi was renamed as Tsandrypsh by the de facto government, but the name Gantiadi is still used informally among Abkhazians and widely in other languages. The name Tsandrypsh derives from the princely family Tsanba.

History 
Gantiadi is said to have been the historical capital of the principality of Saniga before the 6th century AD. It later became the capital of Sadzen.

Demographics
In 2011, Gantiadi had a population of 5,170. Of these, 55.9% were Armenians, 19.6% Abkhaz, 18.4% Russians, 1.2% Ukrainians, 0.9% Georgians and 0.7% Greeks.

Main sights 
Tsandryphsh houses a 6th-century Georgian Christian church. A personal residence of Joseph Stalin is also located here.

See also
 Gagra District

Notes

External links 
 De facto government's website of Gantiadi

References

Populated places in Gagra District